Sagua de Tánamo is a municipality and town in the Holguín Province of Cuba.

Overview
The Sierra Cristal National Park is partly located in the Sagua de Tánamo municipality and partly in neighboring Mayarí.

The municipality is divided into the barrios of Barrederas, Bazán, Cananovas, Catalina, Esterón, Juan Díaz, Miguel, Pueblo, Sitio and Zabala. Carpintero, la Rosa, Rio Grande, La Guira, Naranjo.

Demographics
In 2004, the municipality of Sagua de Tánamo had a population of 52,013.

See also
 List of cities in Cuba
 Municipalities of Cuba

References

External links

Populated places in Holguín Province
1800s in Cuba
Populated places established in 1804
1804 establishments in New Spain
1800s establishments in the Spanish West Indies